Hooray, It's a Boy! is a 1931 German comedy film directed by Georg Jacoby and starring Lucie Englisch, Max Adalbert and Ida Wüst. It is based on the 1926 play of the same name.

The film's sets were designed by the art directors Emil Hasler and Otto Hunte.

Cast
Lucie Englisch as Henny Weber
Max Adalbert as Geheimrat Theodor Natusius
Ida Wüst as Mathilde Natusius
Fritz Schulz as Dr. Waldemar Weber
Jessie Vihrog as Ellen Lüders
Georg Alexander as Dr. Kurt Brandt
Ralph Arthur Roberts as Fritz Pappenstiel
Lotte Lorring
Vicky Werckmeister as Dienstmädchen Anna
Hans Hermann Schaufuß as Bürovorsteher Kiebitz

See also
It's a Boy (1933)
Hooray, It's a Boy! (1953)
 (1961)

References

External links

1931 comedy films
German comedy films
Films of the Weimar Republic
Films directed by Georg Jacoby
German black-and-white films
1930s German films